East Pilton railway station served the area of East Pilton, Edinburgh, Scotland from 1934 to 1962 on the Leith Branch.

History 
The station opened on 1 December 1934 by the London, Midland and Scottish Railway. The station's name was changed to East Pilton Halt in November . The station closed on 30 April 1962.

References

External links 

Disused railway stations in Edinburgh
Railway stations in Great Britain opened in 1934
Railway stations in Great Britain closed in 1962
Former London, Midland and Scottish Railway stations
1934 establishments in Scotland
1962 disestablishments in Scotland